Gujarat State Electricity Corporation Limited (GSECL) is a wholly owned subsidiary  of the Gujarat Urja Vikas Nigam (GUVN), which came into existence in August 1993 after the unbundling of the GEB. It is a power generation company working in the territory of Gujarat, India. It delivers electricity through four distribution companies – DGVCL, MGVCL, PGVCL and UGVCL.

Profile
Gujarat State Electricity Corporation Limited was incorporated in August 1993 with the objectives to mobilize resources from the market for adding to the generating capacity of Gujarat and improving the quality and cost of existing generation.

GSECL is involved in a wide spectrum of activities to improve the electricity infrastructure and generation of power in Gujarat and has the status of Independent Power Producer (IPP) with approval to undertake new power projects. The Company commenced its commercial operation in the year 1998.

As a part of the reform process, the Government of Gujarat has unbundled the various functions of GEB and GSECL was given responsibility of electricity generation.

GSECL was notified as State Generating Power Plant by Government of Gujarat on 29 May 2004 with the purpose of improving efficiency in the state’s electricity generation activities.

Operational Power Stations

GSECL is also serving Sardar Sarovar Narmada Nigam Limited Hydro-electric project by O&M contract.

See also
Gujarat Urja Vikas Nigam
Canal Solar Power Project

References

External links
 GSECL Official Website
 Holding Company
Dakshin Gujarat Vij Company Limited
Madhya Gujarat Vij Company Limited
Paschim Gujarat Vij Company Limited
Uttar Gujarat Vij Company Limited

Electric-generation companies of India
State electricity agencies of Gujarat
Energy companies established in 1993
1993 establishments in Gujarat